Aurora Airlines serves the following destinations (as of February 2023):

References

Aurora Airlines